Monolepta is a genus of skeletonizing leaf beetles in the family Chrysomelidae. It is the most diverse and widely distributed genus in the Galerucinae sensu stricto, with more than 700 described species occurring almost worldwide. It is missing from the Nearctic realm.

The genus was first established by Louis Alexandre Auguste Chevrolat in 1836 to include species of Galerucinae with an elongated basi-metatarsus (the first tarsomere of the hind leg). In 1875, Félicien Chapuis established the supra-generic group "Monoleptites", which included other Galerucinae with an elongated basi-metatarsus. Other genera traditionally placed in this group include, for example, Luperodes, Candezea and Barombiella. The group "Monoleptites" was later found to be polyphyletic, as an elongated basi-metatarsus has evolved multiple times in the Galerucinae.

Selected species

 Monolepta albipunctata Lei, Xu, Yang & Nie, 2021
 Monolepta alticola Lei, Xu, Yang & Nie, 2021
 Monolepta annamita Laboissiere, 1889
 Monolepta australis Jacoby, 1882
 Monolepta bioculata (Fabricius, 1781)
 Monolepta bivittata Lei, Xu, Yang & Nie, 2021
 Monolepta cavipennis Baly, 1878
 Monolepta cruciata Guérin de Méneville, 1847
 Monolepta hagiangana Bezděk & Beenen, 2020
 Monolepta kuroheri Kimoto, 1966
 Monolepta leechi Jacoby, 1890
 Monolepta leuce Weise, 1903
 Monolepta marginella Weise, 1903
 Monolepta melanogaster (Wiedemann, 1823)
 Monolepta mengsongensis Lei, Xu, Yang & Nie, 2021
 Monolepta pallidula (Baly, 1874)
 Monolepta quadriguttata (Motschulsky, 1860)
 Monolepta rubripennis Lei, Xu, Yang & Nie, 2021
 Monolepta rufofulva Chujo, 1938
 Monolepta sauteri Chujo, 1935
 Monolepta signata (Olivier, 1808)

References

Further reading

 

Galerucinae
Chrysomelidae genera
Taxa named by Louis Alexandre Auguste Chevrolat